Toyokawa (written: 豊川) is a Japanese surname. Notable people with the surname include:

, Japanese actor
, Japanese shogi player
, Japanese footballer

Japanese-language surnames